Decorator crabs are crabs of several different species, belonging to the superfamily Majoidea (not all of which are decorators), that use materials from their environment to hide from, or ward off, predators. They decorate themselves by sticking mostly sedentary animals and plants to their bodies as camouflage, or if the attached organisms are noxious, to ward off predators through aposematism.

History

In 1889, William Bateson observed in detail the way that decorator crabs fix materials on their backs. He noted that "the whole proceeding is most human and purposeful", and that if a Stenorhynchus crab is cleaned, it will "immediately begin to clothe itself again with the same care and precision as before".

In his The Colours of Animals (1890), Edward Bagnall Poulton classified protective animal coloration into types such as warning colours and protective mimicry. He included self decoration under the heading "Adventitious Protection", quoting Bateson's account of decorator crabs.

In his Adaptive Coloration in Animals (1940), Hugh Bamford Cott describes self decoration under the heading "adventitious concealing coloration", also naming it "adventitious resemblance". He describes it as a device "perhaps unrivalled" for effective concealment, and points out that it is brought about and depends on "highly specialized behaviour". Further, it grades into other means of protection including "the borrowing of protection from aposematic partners" and the use of "fortified hiding-places" and burrows. Cott compares the way Australian aborigines once used water lily leaves over their faces to swim up to waterfowl until they could catch them by the legs.

Camouflage

Cott described the decorator crabs as using "concealment afforded by masks of adventitious material", giving as example the great spider crab Hyas araneus of Britain "which disguises itself very perfectly". When H. araneus specimens were moved from an environment where all the crabs were camouflaged with short pieces of seaweed into different environments, all of them had redecorated themselves with local materials after one night. One was among corallines, and was covered with a dense bush of the hydrozoan Sertularia abietina. Another was on small shells and gravel, and was decorated with those. A third was among the crinoid Antedon rosaceus, and had broken off pieces of crinoid arms as decoration.

Bateson, in a much quoted passage, describes crabs of the genera Stenorhynchus and Inachus: the crab tears a piece of seaweed in its claws, chews it, and then rubs it firmly on its body until it catches on the "Velcro-like hooked setae", curved hairs which permit camouflage materials to be attached. The carefully chosen decoration is supplemented by cryptic behaviour, such as remaining still by day, and freezing when predators approach.

Hultgren and Stachowicz (2011) showed that the species of Majoidea whose juveniles camouflage themselves are scattered about the phylogenetic tree – some species do, some do not, and some do so only a little. About 75% of the Majoidea decorate themselves to some extent during at least one phase of their lifecycle, and this number includes all 8 families in that superfamily.

Antipredator defence

Reviewing studies conducted by different authors, Hultgren and Stachowicz showed that some species are highly specialised in their choices of camouflage. For example, Pelia tumida decorates itself only with sponges; Macropodia rostrata and Libinia dubia choose the noxious alga Dictyota menstrualis in some places, while Inachus phalangium chooses the same alga for the most exposed parts of its body; and Stenocionops furcata selects the stinging sea anemone Calliactis tricolor for its carapace. The choice of noxious or stinging organisms as decorations implies that attaching them provides protection from predators by aposematism rather than by crypsis, and there is direct observational evidence for this, e.g. that octopuses in tanks avoided decorated crabs. The relationship of crab and organisms such as sea anemones used as decoration may be mutualistic, offering protection to the crab and food to the anemone.

Species
Decorator crabs come from many different genera, and are distributed worldwide. Some examples are described in the table.

References

External links
 SeaDB: World Database of Marine Species: Decorator Crabs (list of species, photographs, videos)

Majoidea
Camouflage